Pegasus Publications Inc. is a Winnipeg based magazine and books publisher with an additional office in Toronto (unconnected to the British magazine publisher of the early 1990s). They are the publishers of Manitoba Gardener Living, Alberta Gardener Living, Ontario Gardener Living, SMART Connections Magazine, Canadian Trees Magazine, Beautiful Communities Magazine, Beautiful Lifestyles Magazine and The Winnipeg Access Guide.

Through contracts with other associations Pegasus publishes Western Aviation, The Assiniboia Chamber of Commerce Guide, Creative Retirement and The Manitoba Society of Seniors Journal, as well.

It was founded in 1998 when former Member of Parliament Dorothy Dobbie launched Manitoba Gardener and then expanded as sister publications were started in neighbouring provinces.

References
 

Magazine publishing companies of Canada
1998 establishments in Canada